Vitória Clube do Pico da Pedra (known as Vitória Pico da Pedra or Vitória P. Pedra), is a Portuguese football club based in Pico da Pedra on the island of São Miguel in the Azores.

Background
Vitória Pico Pedra currently plays in the AF Ponta Delgada 1ª Divisão (known as the Campeonato de S. Miguel) which is the fifth tier of Portuguese football. The club was founded in 1992 and they play their home matches at the Estádio José da Silva Calisto in Pico da Pedra. The stadium is able to accommodate 2,000 spectators.

The club is affiliated to Associação de Futebol de Ponta Delgada and has competed in the AF Ponta Delgada Taça. The club has also entered the national cup competition known as Taça de Portugal in 2002/03 winning away 2–1 to Angústias Atlético before going out 5–0 away to CD Mafra.

Season to season

Honours
AF Ponta Delgada Taça de Honra: 2009/10
AF Ponta Delgada S. Miguel: 2007/08

Footnotes

External links
Official website

Football clubs in Portugal
Association football clubs established in 1992
1992 establishments in Portugal